The 1926 Slavery Convention or the Convention to Suppress the Slave Trade and Slavery is an international treaty created under the auspices of the League of Nations and first signed on 25 September 1926. It was registered in League of Nations Treaty Series on 9 March 1927, the same day it went into effect. The objective of the convention is to confirm and advance the suppression of slavery and the slave trade and was extended in 1956 with the Supplementary Convention on the Abolition of Slavery, under the auspices of the United Nations.

Background
In the Brussels Conference Act of 1890, the signatories "declared that they were equally animated by the firm intention of putting an end to the traffic in African slaves". It was supplemented and revised by the Convention of Saint-Germain-en-Laye, signed by the Allied Powers of the First World War on 10 September 1919, in which the signatories undertook to "endeavour to secure the complete suppression of slavery in all its forms and of the slave trade by land and sea" (Article 11).  The slavery and slave trade in the Arabian Peninsula, and particular the slave trade in Hejaz, attracted attention by the League of Nations and contributed to the creation of the later 1926 Slavery Convention, obliging the British to combat the slave trade in the area.

A Temporary Slavery Commission was appointed by the Council of the League of Nations in June 1924. The commission was mixed in composition including former colonial governors such as Frederick Lugard, as well as a representative from Haiti, and a representative from the International Labour Organization.

Significance
The convention established concrete rules and articles to advance the suppression of slavery and the slave trade.

Slavery was defined in Article 1 as 
the status or condition of a person over whom any or all of the powers attaching to the right of ownership are exercised

The slave trade was defined as including
all acts involved in the capture, acquisition or disposal of a person with intent to reduce him to slavery; all acts involved in the acquisition of a slave with a view to selling or exchanging him; all acts of disposal by sale or exchange of a slave acquired with a view to being sold or exchanged, and, in general, every act of trade or transport in slaves.

Selected articles 
Article 2
The parties agreed to prevent and suppress the slave trade and to progressively bring about the complete elimination of slavery in all its forms.

Article 6
The parties undertook to promulgate severe penalties for slave trading, slaveholding, and enslavement.

Participants
As of 2013, there are 99 countries that have signed, acceded to, ratified, succeeded to, or otherwise committed to participation in the conventions as amended, and its subsequent protocol. The countries and the year of their first commitment to participation are as follows:

Afghanistan (1954), Albania (1957), Algeria (1963), Australia  (1953), Austria (1954), Azerbaijan (1996), Bahamas (1976), Bahrain (1990), Bangladesh (1985), Barbados (1976), Belarus (1956, as the Byelorussian SSR), Belgium (1962), Bolivia (1983), Bosnia and Herzegovina (1993),  Brazil (1966), Cameroon (1984), Canada (1953), Chile (1995), China (1955), Croatia (1992), Cuba (1954), Cyprus (1986),  Denmark (1954), Dominica (1994), Ecuador (1955), Egypt (1954), Ethiopia (1969),  Fiji (1972), Finland (1954), France (1963), Germany (1973), Greece (1955), Guatemala (1983), Guinea (1963), Hungary (1958), India (1954), Iraq (1955), Ireland (1961), Israel (1955), Italy (1954),  Jamaica (1964),  Jordan (1959), Kazakhstan (2008),  Kuwait (1963),  Kyrgyzstan (1997), Lesotho (1974), Liberia (1953), Libya (1957), Madagascar (1964), Malawi (1965), Mali (1973), Malta (1966), Mauritania (1986), Mauritius (1969), Mexico (1954), Monaco (1954), Mongolia (1968), Montenegro (2006), Morocco (1959), Myanmar (1957), Nepal (1963),  Netherlands (1955), New Zealand (1953), Nicaragua (1986), Niger (1964), Nigeria (1961), Norway (1957), Pakistan (1955), Paraguay (2007), Papua New Guinea (1982), Philippines (1955),   Romania (1957), Russia (1956) (as the Soviet Union), St Lucia (1990), St Vincent and the Grenadines (1981), Saudi Arabia (1973), Serbia (2001, as Serbia and Montenegro), Sierra Leone (1962), Solomon Islands (1981), South Africa (1953), Spain (1927), Sri Lanka (1958), Sudan (1957), Sweden (1954), Switzerland (1953), Syria (1954), Tanzania (1962), Trinidad and Tobago (1966), Tunisia (1966), Turkey (1955), Turkmenistan (1997), Uganda (1964), Ukraine (1959, as the Ukrainian SSR), United Kingdom (1953),  United States (1956), Uruguay (2001), Viet Nam (1956), Yemen (1987), Zambia (1973) ''

Updates
The convention was amended by the protocol entering into force on 7 July 1955.

The definition of slavery was further refined and extended by a 1956 Supplementary Convention.

See also

Abolitionism
OHCHR – Office of the United     Nations High Commissioner for Refugees.           
Slave Trade Acts
Supplementary Convention on the Abolition of Slavery of 1956
International Agreement for the suppression of the White Slave Traffic

References

External links
 Text of the Convention at the Office of the United Nations High Commissioner for Human Rights
 Text of the 'Slavery, Servitude, Forced Labour and Similar Institutions and Practices Convention of 1926' at the UMN Human Rights Library
 Signatories and parties 
 Abolishing Slavery and its Contemporary Forms Office of the United Nations High Commissioner for Human Rights

League of Nations treaties
Treaties concluded in 1926
Treaties entered into force in 1927
Anti-slavery treaties
Treaties of the Kingdom of Afghanistan
Treaties of the People's Socialist Republic of Albania
Treaties of Algeria
Treaties of Australia
Treaties of Austria
Treaties of Azerbaijan
Treaties of the Bahamas
Treaties of Bahrain
Treaties of Bangladesh
Treaties of Barbados
Treaties of the Byelorussian Soviet Socialist Republic
Treaties of Belgium
Treaties of Bolivia
Treaties of Bosnia and Herzegovina
Treaties of the military dictatorship in Brazil
Treaties of Cameroon
Treaties of Canada
Treaties of Chile
Treaties of Croatia
Treaties of Cuba
Treaties of Cyprus
Treaties of Denmark
Treaties of Dominica
Treaties of Ecuador
Treaties of the Republic of Egypt (1953–1958)
Treaties of the Ethiopian Empire
Treaties of Fiji
Treaties of Finland
Treaties of France
Treaties of West Germany
Treaties of the Kingdom of Greece
Treaties of Guatemala
Treaties of Guinea
Treaties of the Hungarian People's Republic
Treaties of India
Treaties of the Kingdom of Iraq
Treaties of Ireland
Treaties of Israel
Treaties of Italy
Treaties of Jamaica
Treaties of Jordan
Treaties of Kuwait
Treaties of Kyrgyzstan
Treaties of Lesotho
Treaties of Liberia
Treaties of the Kingdom of Libya
Treaties of Madagascar
Treaties of Malawi
Treaties of Mali
Treaties of Malta
Treaties of Mauritania
Treaties of Mauritius
Treaties of Mexico
Treaties of Monaco
Treaties of the Mongolian People's Republic
Treaties of Morocco
Treaties of Myanmar
Treaties of Nepal
Treaties of the Netherlands
Treaties of New Zealand
Treaties of Nicaragua
Treaties of Niger
Treaties of Nigeria
Treaties of Norway
Treaties of the Dominion of Pakistan
Treaties of Papua New Guinea
Treaties of the Philippines
Treaties of the Socialist Republic of Romania
Treaties of the Soviet Union
Treaties of Saint Lucia
Treaties of Saint Vincent and the Grenadines
Treaties of Saudi Arabia
Treaties of Sierra Leone
Treaties of the Solomon Islands
Treaties of the Union of South Africa
Treaties of Spain under the Restoration
Treaties of the Dominion of Ceylon
Treaties of the Republic of the Sudan (1956–1969)
Treaties of Sweden
Treaties of Switzerland
Treaties of the Syrian Republic (1930–1963)
Treaties of the Republic of China (1949–1971)
Treaties of Trinidad and Tobago
Treaties of Tunisia
Treaties of Turkey
Treaties of Turkmenistan
Treaties of Uganda
Treaties of the Ukrainian Soviet Socialist Republic
Treaties of the United Kingdom
Treaties of Tanzania
Treaties of the United States
Treaties of Uruguay
Treaties of Vietnam
Treaties of Serbia and Montenegro
Treaties of Zambia
Treaties of East Germany
Treaties of Kazakhstan
Treaties of Montenegro
Treaties of Yugoslavia
Treaties of Paraguay
1926 in Switzerland
Treaties extended to the Faroe Islands
Treaties extended to Greenland
Treaties extended to Hong Kong
Treaties extended to South West Africa
Treaties extended to British Burma
Treaties extended to Curaçao and Dependencies
Treaties extended to the Dutch East Indies
Treaties extended to Surinam (Dutch colony)
Treaties extended to Spanish Guinea
Treaties extended to Spanish Sahara
Treaties extended to Anglo-Egyptian Sudan
20th century in Geneva
September 1926 events